Agathis is a genus of braconid parasitoid wasps. This genus was established by Latreille in 1804, and the type species is Agathis malvacearum Latreille, 1805. There are at least forty six species of Agathis in the western palearctic region.

Selected species
 Agathis longipalpus
 Agathis malvacearum Latreille, 1805 (parasitoid of the burdock seedhead moth)

References

Further reading

 
 
 

Parasitic wasps
Braconidae
Braconidae genera